Muchachita (English title:Girl) is a Mexican telenovela produced by Carlos Téllez and Lucero Suárez for Televisa in 1986. It is an original story and adaptation of the fotonovela "Muchachita" of Ricardo Rentería. It starred Lourdes Munguía, Gonzalo Vega, Talina Fernández, Beatriz Aguirre and Manuel Saval.

Plot
Maribel Montesinos is a beautiful girl from a wealthy family who is engaged to José Manuel Montesinos, another young man of good family. But shortly before the wedding, Maribel suffers a blow: he is a victim of rape, and as a result become pregnant. Maribel, initially, is undecided about whether to have the baby, but eventually decides to continue her pregnancy, thanks to the values instilled her mother when she was alive. However, her father opposes his decision and Maribel decides to break his commitment to José Manuel. Initially not give any explanation, but ultimately feels obliged to tell the truth. José Manuel does not react well and asks her to abort, she indignantly denies it and despite the rejection of society and his family circle decides to have the baby against all odds.

Maribel's father decides to take her to live in his house to avoid the gossip of the town, but there is discovered that abused the girl who was the builder of poor Pascual, alcoholic and evil death. At birth the baby Maribel, her father hatches an evil plan and gives her granddaughter Pascual, while Maribel decides to take her to Paris. Maribel refuses, but her father threatens to never tell who gave his daughter if you do not go with him.

So Rosa daughter of Maribel, grows in a neighborhood in the company of Ticha, a noble woman raising as his own daughter, while supporting the harassment of useless Pascual, which remains mired in drink. When Rosa turns into a beautiful young woman, helps Ticha in the fruit stand she has also Chucho Rosa falls in love with a blind girl who lives in the neighborhood with his mother Nena a former actress who, by too old to get pregnant, your child was born with blindness.

Ticha hides Rosa as daughter of a society lady. When the economic situation of the two women becomes very precarious, Rosa offers to go to sell fruit on the streets. In one of the streets, in front of the National Institute of Fine Arts, will meet José Manuel who was engaged to her mother. José Manuel is now professor of literature at the university, and is attracted by the beautiful girl and want to transform it into a cultured and refined woman. Since suffering the disappointment with Maribel, José Manuel became sullen and reluctant to engage in another relationship with a woman, so it feels very happy when seen in the innocence of Rosa another chance to find love.

José Manuel Rosa takes her home, and instead of refined classes he gives her, she began working as a servant in his house. However, not all received with equal enthusiasm to the girl. Amanda's mother, José Manuel, the poor girl looks like an opportunist who seeks only money the family, so in protest leaves the house. While Mérida, the housekeeper, is responsible for making life miserable for her.

Although the worst is yet to come, as Maribel, who still suffers the loss of his daughter, reappears in the life of José Manuel ready to conquer it, however you will see Rosa as their main enemy, suspecting that rivals his own daughter.

Cast 
Lourdes Munguía as Rosa Sánchez
Gonzalo Vega as José Manuel Palacios
Talina Fernández as Maribel Montesinos
Beatriz Aguirre as Nena Martínez
Manuel Saval as Chucho Landeros
Ana Bertha Lepe as Ticha
José Carlos Ruiz as Pascual Sánchez
Bertha Moss as Amanda Montesinos
Luis Aguilar as Gabriel Landeros
Josefina Escobedo as Rutila
Gastón Tuset as Germán
Ada Carrasco as Lucha
Martha Zamora as Bertha
Silvia Caos as Mérida
Mauricio Ferrari as Luccino
Vittorina Garessi as Olga
Rosa Carmina as Linda Rey
Olivia Collins as Irene
Toño Infante as Santos Vega
Joana Brito as Brígida
María Prado as Nicolasa
Raúl Meraz as Don Felipe Montesinos
Graciela Orozco as Gervasia
Fernando Amaya as Jean Carlo
Mercedes Pascual

Awards

References

External links

1985 telenovelas
Mexican telenovelas
1985 Mexican television series debuts
1986 Mexican television series endings
Spanish-language telenovelas
Television shows set in Mexico
Televisa telenovelas